Lucius Clay may refer to:

Lucius D. Clay (1897–1978), American military governor of Germany after World War II
Lucius D. Clay, Jr. (1919–1994), American commander of the Air Defense Command
Lucius Clay is also the protagonist in the song "The Legend of Wooley Swamp" by country musician Charlie Daniels